Barry Lambert (born 1981) is an Irish former hurler. At club level he played with St. Martin's and was also a member of the Wexford senior hurling team. He usually lined out as a forward.

Career

Lambert first played at juvenile and underage levels with the St. Martin's club. He later joined the club's top adult team and won County Championship titles in 1999 and 2008. He also lined out with St. Peter's College at colleges level and with Dublin Institute of Technology in the Fitzgibbon Cup. Lambert first appeared on the inter-county scene at minor level with Wexford before lining out in the 2001 All-Ireland under-21 final defeat by Limerick. His underage performances saw him drafted onto the Wexford senior hurling team in 2001. Over the course of the following decade Lambert was a regular on the team and won a Leinster Championship medal in 2004. A shoulder injury brought his inter-county career to an end in 2009.

Career statistics

Honours

St. Martin's
Wexford Senior Hurling Championship: 1999, 2008

Wexford
Leinster Senior Hurling Championship: 2004
Leinster Under-21 Hurling Championship: 2001

References

1981 births
Living people
St Martin's (Wexford) hurlers
Wexford inter-county hurlers